Mount Quilmes (715 m) is a mainly snow-covered mountain, standing northeast of Haddon Bay on Joinville Island. The name was given during the course of the Argentine Antarctic Expedition (1953–54) and commemorates the battle of the same name in which the Argentine squadron of Admiral Guillermo Brown was engaged.

See also
West Antarctica

External links
 

Mountains of Graham Land
Landforms of the Joinville Island group